Rashid Nuhu (born 7 December 1995) is a Ghanaian footballer who currently plays as a goalkeeper for Union Omaha in USL League One.

Career

Youth and college
Nuhu played four years of college soccer at Fordham University between 2015 and 2018, where he made a total of 74 appearances for the Rams. He was named first team All-Atlantic 10 Conference in both his junior and senior seasons and the Most Outstanding Player of the 2016 Atlantic 10 Men's Soccer Tournament as a sophomore after posting three consecutive shoutouts as Fordham won the tournament.

While at college, Nuhu also played in the USL PDL for both Westchester Flames, in 2016, and New York Red Bulls U-23 in 2018.

New York Red Bulls II
On January 14, 2019, Nuhu was drafted 70th overall in the 2019 MLS SuperDraft by New York Red Bulls. On May 6, 2019, Nuhu signed for the club's USL Championship affiliate New York Red Bulls II.

Union Omaha
On February 16, 2020, Nuhu was announced by Union Omaha in a Twitter video  before the teams' first preseason match against Real Monarchs at the 2020 Wasatch Winter Cup.

Personal
Rashid is the young brother of Ghanaian international footballer Razak Nuhu.

References

External links
 
 

1995 births
Living people
Association football goalkeepers
Fordham Rams men's soccer players
Ghanaian footballers
New York Red Bulls U-23 players
New York Red Bulls II players
New York Red Bulls draft picks
Soccer players from Connecticut
Footballers from Accra
USL Championship players
USL League Two players
Westchester Flames players
Ghanaian expatriate footballers
Ghanaian expatriate sportspeople in the United States
Union Omaha players
USL League One players